Fear Factor: Khatron Ke Khiladi, Pain in Spain is the eighth season of Fear Factor: Khatron Ke Khiladi, an Indian reality and stunt television series aired from 22 July 2017 to 30 September on Colors TV. The series is produced by of Endemol Shine India.
The season, was filmed in Spain, was hosted by Rohit Shetty. Shantanu Maheshwari was declared the winner and Hina Khan became the runner up.

Contestants

Elimination chart

 Winner
 1st Runner Up
 2nd Runner Up
 Finalists
 Ticket To Finale
 Lost Task
 Won First Task
 Was Safe from Elimination stunt
 Bottom Position
 Saved
 Eliminated
 Wild Card Entry
 Injury/Health Hault
 N/A
 Disqualified

Reception

References

External links
 

2017 Indian television seasons
08
Colors TV original programming